EMUI (formerly known as Emotion UI, and also known as Magic UI on Honor smartphones since 2019) is an Android-derived mobile operating system developed by Chinese technology company Huawei. It is used on the company's smartphones and tablets.

In mainland China, and internationally since 2020 due to U.S. sanctions, EMUI devices utilise Huawei Mobile Services such as Huawei AppGallery instead of Google Mobile Services.

History 
On 30 December 2012, Huawei introduced Emotion UI 1.0, based on Android 4.0. It features a voice assistant app (only in Chinese), customizable homescreens and theme-switching. The company rolled out installation files for the Ascend P1 through their website. The company claims that it is "probably the world's most emotional system".

On 4 September 2014, the company announced EMUI 3.0, along with Ascend Mate 7 in the pre-IFA event in Berlin. The user interface was ever since called "EMUI" instead of "Emotion UI". In Mainland China, the release introduces the Huawei AppGallery application store; international markets continued to use Google Play.

In late 2015, Huawei introduced EMUI 4.0, based on Android Marshmallow. In 2016, EMUI 5.0 was introduced, based on Android Nougat. In 2017, Huawei introduced EMUI 8.0, based on Android Oreo; beginning with this release, the version number would now be aligned with that of the Android version from which it was derived.

Huawei unveiled EMUI 9.0, based on Android Pie, at IFA in 2018. Huawei stated a goal for the release to make EMUI more "simple", "enjoyable", and consistent; it included various usability tweaks, reorganized settings menus, dark mode, gesture navigation, and GPU Turbo 2.0. Beginning with EMUI 9.0.1, new Huawei devices ship with the company's EROFS file system for its system partitions, which is designed for higher performance in read-only settings on devices with limited resources. In July 2019, Huawei released EMUI 9.1

EMUI 10, based on Android 10, was announced 9 August 2019 at the Huawei Developer Conference. It features an updated interface with larger "magazine"-styled headings, new animations, colour accents inspired by painter Giorgio Morandi, and Android 10's system-wide dark mode support. Beginning 2020 due to United States sanctions against Huawei (which prohibit U.S.-based companies from doing business with the company), new EMUI smartphones sold internationally (beginning with the Mate 30) are no longer certified by Google, do not include support for Google Mobile Services (GMS) including Google Play, and are marketed as running EMUI with no reference to the Android trademark. These devices introduce AppGallery and Huawei Mobile Services to international markets as an alternative to Google-provided software.

In 2020 alongside the P40, Huawei announced EMUI 10.1, which adds multi-window support, and the new first-party apps Celia and MeeTime. Huawei announced updates for some of its existing devices in June 2020. On September 2020, Huawei publicly announced HarmonyOS 2.0 support for EMUI 11 updated smartphone devices as the company shifts towards HarmonyOS development. In December 2020, Huawei released the HarmonyOS 2.0 beta for the P30, P40 and P50, which iterates from EMUI 10. 

As of October 2021, Huawei plans to launch an upgrade bridge to EMUI 12 to older Huawei smartphone models gradually in the first half of 2022 in global markets while HarmonyOS 2 launches in domestic markets. Prepping EMUI successor, future HarmonyOS development for global markets in the coming years. 

EMUI 12 is the first EMUI version based on HarmonyOS 2 with OpenHarmony 2.1.0 core which features its own distributed file sharing called Distributed File System that adapts with HarmonyOS powered smart devices with smart TVs, smart speakers and other types of devices which is created from native (HDFS) HarmonyOS Distributed File System  and can run native HarmonyOS Ability Package apps. EMUI 12 supports Large Folders that group similar apps in a large folder and name the folder for better organised management and discovery of apps. Difference between EMUI 12 and HarmonyOS running HAP based apps, is that EMUI 12 don't support Atomic Services and App Snippets in the form of interactive visual card based widgets. EMUI 12 don't support HarmonyOS Multi-Device Task Viewer and has a watered down Super Device user experience via Device+. The EMUI 12 update for older global versions of Huawei smartphones is based on Android 10.

On 20th of October 2022, Huawei unveiled their upcoming version of EMUI, which is EMUI 13 on their official website. It inherits the main features unveiled with HarmonyOS 3, such as widgets which can be stacked on top of another, folders which can be resized like Android widgets, and a few other features.

Version history

Reception 
Earlier versions of EMUI have been criticized for placing all app icons on the home screen, with some reviewers saying that it tries to imitate Apple's iOS. The app drawer has been brought back as an option in EMUI 5.0. PC Magazine Adam Smith criticized EMUI for being bloated with duplicate apps and the settings menus being difficult to navigate.

References 

 

Huawei mobile phones
Huawei products
Mobile operating systems
Android (operating system) software
Linux distributions
Mobile Linux
Unix variants